Jordan Wicks (born September 1, 1999) is an American professional baseball pitcher in the Chicago Cubs organization.

Amateur career
Wicks attended Conway High School in Conway, Arkansas, where he played baseball and football. In 2018, his senior year, he went 11–1 with a 0.86 ERA, and finished his high school career with a school record 1.39 ERA. Undrafted in the 2018 Major League Baseball draft, he enrolled at Kansas State University to play college baseball.

In 2019, Wicks' freshman year at Kansas State, he started 15 games and posted a 6-3 record with a 3.61 ERA, and was named the Big 12 Conference Freshman of the Year. He set freshman program records with 86 strikeouts and  innings pitched. As a sophomore in 2020, he started four games and gave up one earned run over 26 innings for a 0.35 ERA before the college baseball season was ended early due to the COVID-19 pandemic. He spent that summer playing in the Northwoods League for the Rockford Rivets, compiling a 0.52 ERA with 52 strikeouts over  innings. Prior to the 2021 season, he was unanimously named the Big 12 Conference Preseason Pitcher of the Year. For the 2021 season, Wicks went 6–3 with a 3.70 ERA over 14 starts, striking out 118 over  innings, earning All-Big 12 First Team honors.

Professional career
Wicks was selected by the Chicago Cubs in the first round with the 21st overall selection of the 2021 Major League Baseball draft. This makes Wicks both the highest and the first ever first round draft pick to come out of Kansas State's baseball program. He signed for a $3.1 million signing bonus.

Wicks made his professional debut with the South Bend Cubs of the High-A Central, pitching seven innings while giving up four earned runs and three walks while striking out five. He returned to South Bend to open the 2022 season. In mid-July, he was promoted to the Tennessee Smokies of the Double-A Southern League. Over 24 starts between the two teams, he went 4-6 with a 3.80 ERA and 121 strikeouts over  innings.

Personal life
Wicks is a Christian, having stated "God is the rock of my life. He is always there and he always loves me no matter what happens on that field.“

References

External links

Kansas State bio

1999 births
Living people
Baseball players from Arkansas
Baseball pitchers
Kansas State Wildcats baseball players
South Bend Cubs players
Tennessee Smokies players